Exo Planet #5 - Exploration (stylized as EXO PLANET #5 – EXplOration) is the fourth live album by South Korean-Chinese boy band Exo. It was released on April 21, 2020, by SM Entertainment and distributed by Dreamus.

Track listing

See also
 Exo Planet 5 – Exploration

References

2020 live albums
Exo albums